Jeff Kelly may refer to:

 Jeff Kelly (quarterback) (born 1979), former American football quarterback
 Jeff Kelly (linebacker) (born 1975), former American football linebacker